Giulio (Yoel) Racah  (February 9, 1909 – August 28, 1965) was an Italian–Israeli physicist and mathematician. He was Acting President of the Hebrew University of Jerusalem from 1961 to 1962.

The crater Racah on the Moon is named after him.

Biography
Giulio (Yoel) Racah was born in Florence, Italy. He earned his BA from the University of Florence in 1930, and continued his studies at Rome with Enrico Fermi.

In 1939, due to application of Anti-Jewish laws in Italy, Racah emigrated to the British Mandate of Palestine. In the 1948 Arab–Israeli War, Racah served as deputy commander of the Israeli forces defending Mount Scopus.

Racah died at the age of 56, apparently asphyxiated by gas from a faulty heater while visiting Florence.

Academic and scientific career
In 1937 Racah was appointed Professor of Physics at the University of Pisa. In 1939, after his move to Palestine, he was appointed Professor of Theoretical Physics at the Hebrew University of Jerusalem, He later became  Dean of the Faculty of Sciences and finally Rector and acting president from 1961 to 1962, following Benjamin Mazar and succeeded by Eliahu Eilat. The physics institute at the Hebrew University is named "The Racah Institute of Physics".

Racah's research was mainly in the fields of quantum physics and atomic spectroscopy. He first devised a systematic general procedure for classifying the energy levels of open shell atoms, which remains to this day the accepted technique for practical calculations of atomic structure. This formalism was described in a monograph coauthored by his cousin Ugo Fano (Irreducible Tensorial Sets, 1959).

Awards and recognition
In 1958, Racah was awarded the Israel Prize in exact sciences.

See also
Racah W-coefficient
Racah parameter
Racah polynomials
Racah seniority number
Racah Lectures in Physics
List of Israel Prize recipients
Science and technology in Israel

References

External links 
 Timeline (at Racah Institute of Physics at Hebrew University)
 Link to Racah Crater on Google Moon

20th-century Italian mathematicians
20th-century Israeli physicists
20th-century Israeli mathematicians
20th-century Italian physicists
Italian emigrants to Mandatory Palestine
Italian Zionists
20th-century Italian Jews
University of Florence alumni
Academic staff of the University of Pisa
Academic staff of the Hebrew University of Jerusalem
Israel Prize in exact science recipients
Israel Prize in exact science recipients who were mathematicians
Israel Prize in exact science recipients who were physicists
Members of the Israel Academy of Sciences and Humanities
Scientists from Florence
1909 births
1965 deaths
Jewish physicists
Presidents of universities in Israel
Italian refugees